Stronghold is a Dungeons & Dragons city-building real-time strategy computer game published by SSI and developed by Stormfront Studios in 1993.

Gameplay
Players balance resources to build a town with unique neighborhoods, each with its own unique architecture. Residents and craftspeople of each neighborhood can be summoned to defend any part of the city that comes under attack. Players can choose from a variety of neighborhood leaders, including Mages, Clerics, Thieves, Fighters, Elves (a combination of fighters and mages), Dwarves (stout fighters who are also great miners), and Halflings (excellent farmers with some thief abilities). Players can use, for example, a spawned Elf to build a building on a plot or the player can focus the elf on training to build up character levels, amass an army and march them overland and defeat a neighboring monster. Or a player can focus entirely on city development and win the game in that way instead. Maps are constructed from triangular wireframe colored tiles. The color of each tile designate the terrain typewater, plains, mountains and hills. The game includes a random map generator.

Reception
According to GameSpy, "cities could quickly become very difficult to manage, but those players who became fans swore that the game was one of the most addictive management simulations they had ever played".

References

External links
 

1993 video games
City-building games
DOS games
Dungeons & Dragons video games
FM Towns games
NEC PC-9801 games
Real-time strategy video games
Stormfront Studios games
Strategic Simulations games
Video games developed in the United States
Video games with 2.5D graphics